The 2017 NASCAR Whelen Modified Tour was the thirty-third season of the Whelen Modified Tour (WMT), a stock car racing tour sanctioned by NASCAR. It began with the Performance Plus 150 presented by Safety-Kleen at Myrtle Beach Speedway on March 18 and concluded with the Sunoco World Series 150 at Thompson Speedway Motorsports Park on October 15. Doug Coby entered the season as the defending Drivers' Champion. 2017 marked the first season of the unification of the Whelen (Northern) Modified Tour and the Whelen Southern Modified Tour. Doug Coby won the championship, six points in front of Timmy Solomito.

Drivers

Notes

Schedule
The All-Star Shootout and the Southern Slam 150 did not count towards the championship. The Performance Plus 150 presented by Safety-Kleen, the Icebreaker 150, City of Hampton 150 and the Thompson 125 were shown live on FansChoice.tv. Eleven of the eighteen races in the 2017 season were televised on NBCSN on a tape delay basis.

Notes

The race at the Waterford Speedbowl was originally scheduled for 22 July, but was removed from the schedule by NASCAR on 6 April following the track owner's arrest a week earlier.

Results and Standings

Races

Notes
1 – There was no qualifying session for the Whelen Modified All-Star Shootout. The starting grid was decided with a random draw.
2 – The qualifying session for the Eastern Propane & Oil 100 was cancelled due to weather. The starting line-up was decided by Practice results.

Drivers' championship

(key) Bold – Pole position awarded by time. Italics – Pole position set by final practice results or Owners' points. * – Most laps led.

Notes
‡ – Non-championship round.
1 – Jeremy Gerstner received championship points, despite the fact that he withdrew prior to the race.
† – Ted Christopher died in a plane crash near the North Branford and Guilford, Connecticut town line while en routing to Riverhead Raceway.

See also

2017 Monster Energy NASCAR Cup Series
2017 NASCAR Xfinity Series
2017 NASCAR Camping World Truck Series
2017 NASCAR K&N Pro Series East
2017 NASCAR K&N Pro Series West
2017 NASCAR Pinty's Series
2017 NASCAR PEAK Mexico Series
2017 NASCAR Whelen Euro Series

References